The Bietschhorn  (3,934 m) is a mountain in canton Wallis to the south of the Bernese Alps in Switzerland. The northeast and southern slopes of the mountain are part of the Jungfrau-Aletsch Protected Area (formerly Jungfrau-Aletsch-Bietschhorn) listed as a UNESCO World Heritage Site that also includes the Jungfrau and the Aletsch Glacier. The Bietschhorn is located on the south side of the Lötschental valley and form part of the UNESCO World Heritage Region at the north end of the Bietschtal valley and Baltschiedertal valley. Most climbers approach the mountain from either the Bietschhornhütte or the Baltschiederklause.

It was first climbed on 13 August 1859 by Leslie Stephen, with guides Anton Siegen, Johann Siegen and Joseph Ebener. An account of some of Stephen's first ascents was published by Leslie Stephen in his book The Playground of Europe (1871). The Bietschhorn ascent however is not mentioned in that classic mountaineering book.

See also

List of mountains of the Alps above 3000 m
List of mountains of Valais
List of mountains of Switzerland
List of most isolated mountains of Switzerland

References

External links
Bietschhorn on SummitPost
Climbing the Bietschhorn 
Photographs 

Mountains of the Alps
Alpine three-thousanders
World Heritage Sites in Switzerland
Bernese Alps
Mountains of Valais
Mountains of Switzerland
Three-thousanders of Switzerland